Major Albert Rugby Pratt (1875–1946) was a New Zealand Methodist minister, church administrator and historian. He was born in Gisborne, East Coast, New Zealand in 1875.

References

1875 births
1946 deaths
People from Gisborne, New Zealand
New Zealand Methodist ministers
20th-century New Zealand historians